Chocorua is an unincorporated community within the town of Tamworth in Carroll County, New Hampshire, United States.  It is located in the general area where Routes 16 and 113 meet, south of Mount Chocorua and Chocorua Lake.

Mount Chocorua is commonly known in the area as the "Matterhorn" of the White Mountains due to its triangular summit. Chocorua Lake, along NH 16 at the southern base of the mountain, is a common stopping place for photos of the mountain landscape.

Notable people 

 Truman Howe Bartlett, sculptor, Abraham Lincoln photography historian (summer resident)
 Raymond W. Bliss, Army surgeon general
 James Read Chadwick, gynecologist and medical librarian (summer resident)
 William James, philosopher and US founder of experimental psychology; died in Chocorua
 Paul Scott Mowrer, New Hampshire's first Poet Laureate; lived in Chocorua
 Hadley Richardson, the first wife of Ernest Hemingway.
 Robert I. Rotberg, former President of the World Peace Foundation (vacation resident)

References

External links
Chocorua Public Library

Unincorporated communities in New Hampshire
Unincorporated communities in Carroll County, New Hampshire
Tamworth, New Hampshire
New Hampshire placenames of Native American origin